Dick Strahm (born February 23, 1934) is a former American football coach.  He served as the head coach at the University of Findlay in Findlay, Ohio from 1975 to 1998, compiling a record of 183–64–5.  His Findlay teams won four NAIA Football National Championships, in 1979, 1992, 1995, and 1997.  Strahm was inducted into the College Football Hall of Fame in 2004.  His biography entitled Just Call Me Coach, written by John Grindrod of Lima, Ohio, was released in December 2008.

Head coaching record

References

External links
 

1934 births
Living people
Findlay Oilers football coaches
Kansas State Wildcats football coaches
Toledo Rockets football coaches
High school football coaches in Ohio
College Football Hall of Fame inductees
Sportspeople from Toledo, Ohio